TON 618 (short for Tonantzintla 618) is a hyperluminous, broad-absorption-line, radio-loud quasar and Lyman-alpha blob located near the border of the constellations Canes Venatici and Coma Berenices, with the projected comoving distance of approximately 18.2 billion light-years from Earth. It possesses one of the most massive black holes ever found, at 66 billion .

Observational history 

Because quasars were not recognized until 1963, the nature of this object was unknown when it was first noted in a 1957 survey of faint blue stars (mainly white dwarfs) that lie away from the plane of the Milky Way. On photographic plates taken with the 0.7 m Schmidt telescope at the Tonantzintla Observatory in Mexico, it appeared "decidedly violet" and was listed by the Mexican astronomers Braulio Iriarte and Enrique Chavira as entry number 618 in the Tonantzintla Catalogue.

In 1970, a radio survey at Bologna in Italy discovered radio emission from TON 618, indicating that it was a quasar. Marie-Helene Ulrich then obtained optical spectra of TON 618 at the McDonald Observatory which showed emission lines typical of a quasar. From the high redshift of the lines Ulrich deduced that TON 618 was very distant, and hence was one of the most luminous quasars known.

Components

Supermassive black hole 

As a quasar, TON 618 is believed to be the active galactic nucleus at the center of a galaxy, the engine of which is a supermassive black hole feeding on intensely hot gas and matter in an accretion disc. The light originating from the quasar is estimated to be 10.8 billion years old. Due to the brilliance of the central quasar, the surrounding galaxy is outshone by it and hence is not visible from Earth. With an absolute magnitude of −30.7, it shines with a luminosity of  watts, or as brilliantly as 140 trillion times that of the Sun, making it one of the brightest objects in the known Universe.

Like other quasars, TON 618 has a spectrum containing emission lines from cooler gas much further out than the accretion disc, in the broad-line region. The size of the broad-line region can be calculated from the brightness of the quasar radiation that is lighting it up. Shemmer and coauthors used both NV and CIV emission lines in order to calculate the widths of the Hβ spectral line of at least 29 quasars, including TON 618, as a direct measurement of their accretion rates and hence the mass of the central black hole. 

The emission lines in the spectrum of TON 618 have been found to be unusually wide, indicating that the gas is travelling very fast; the full width half maxima of TON 618 has been the largest of the 29 quasars, with hints of 10,500 km/s speeds of infalling material by a direct measure of the Hβ line, indication of a very strong gravitational force. From this measure, the mass of the central black hole of TON 618 is at least 66 billion solar masses. This is considered one of the highest masses ever recorded for such an object; higher than the mass of all stars in the Milky Way galaxy combined, which is 64 billion solar masses, and 15,300 times more massive than Sagittarius A*, the Milky Way's central black hole. With such high mass, TON 618 may fall into a proposed new classification of ultramassive black holes. A black hole of this mass has a Schwarzschild radius of 1,300 AU (about 390 billion km in diameter) which is more than 40 times the distance from Neptune to the Sun.

Lyman-alpha nebula 

The nature of TON 618 as a Lyman-alpha emitter has been well documented since at least the 1980s. Lyman-alpha emitters are characterized by their significant emission of the Lyman-alpha line, a special wavelength emitted by neutral hydrogen (121.567 nm wavelength, in the vacuum ultraviolet). Such objects, however, have proven to be very difficult to study due to the nature of the Lyman-alpha line being strongly absorbed by air in the Earth's atmosphere, making identified Lyman-alpha emitters only limited to objects in the distant universe due to their high redshift. TON 618, with its luminous emission of Lyman-alpha radiation along with its high redshift, has made it one of the most important objects in the study of the Lyman-alpha forest.

Observations made by the Atacama Large Millimeter Array (ALMA) in 2021 revealed the apparent source of the Lyman-alpha radiation of TON 618: an enormous cloud of gas surrounding the quasar and its host galaxy. This would make it a Lyman-alpha blob (LAB), one of the largest such objects yet known.

LABs are huge collections of gases, or nebulae, that are also classified as Lyman-alpha emitters. These enormous, galaxy-sized clouds are some of the largest nebulae known to exist, with some identified LABs in the 2000s reaching sizes of at least hundreds of thousands of light-years across.

In the case of TON 618, the enormous Lyman-alpha nebula surrounding it has the diameter of at least , twice the size of the Milky Way. The nebula consists of two parts: an inner molecular outflow and an extensive  cold molecular gas in its circumgalactic medium, each having the mass of 50 billion , with both of them being aligned to the radio jet produced by the central quasar. The extreme radiation from TON 618 excites the hydrogen in the nebula so much that causes it to glow brightly in the Lyman-alpha line, consistent with the observations of other LABs driven by their inner galaxies. Since both quasars and LABs are precursors of modern-day galaxies, the observation on TON 618 and its enormous LAB gave insight to the processes that drive the evolution of massive galaxies, in particular probing their ionization and early development.

See also
 List of most massive black holes
 Quasar
 Lyman-alpha blob

Other notable objects in the Tonantzintla Catalogue 

 NGC 6380 – globular cluster listed as TON 1, the first entry of the Tonantzintla Catalogue.
 SX Leonis Minoris – variable star listed as TON 45.
 U Geminorum – star system listed as TON 842.
 RZ Leonis Minoris – cataclysmic variable listed as TON 1107.

Notes

References

Quasars
Astronomical objects discovered in 1957
Canes Venatici
Supermassive black holes
Lyman-alpha blobs